Köhnəqışlaq or Këgnakyshlak may refer to:
 Köhnəqışlaq, Agstafa, Azerbaijan
 Köhnəqışlaq, Gadabay, Azerbaijan